Love's Labor Lost is a 1920 short animated film by Bray Productions and is one of the silent Krazy Kat cartoons. The film's title references a play by William Shakespeare.

Plot
A rat is sitting on a rock at a park, wondering how he should spend his day. He then sees a charming girl hippo and develops affection for her despite the size difference. Although a boy elephant was first to come and court her, the rat finds this a minor problem and thinks of how to split them.

Just then, Krazy Kat comes to the area. Krazy begins playing a song in his banjo, hoping to win the rat's friendship. The rat, however, is uninterested, and grabs Krazy's instrument before knocking down the cat with it. The rat then approaches the girl hippo and tries to serenade her with the banjo. Because the boy elephant has a fear of rodents, the rat easily drives away the elephant, who runs away in panic.

After fleeing the park, the boy elephant finds himself outside a tavern. He notices a barrel of Bevo next to him. The elephant drinks the contents of the barrel and gets the courage to confront the rat.

The elephant returns to the park and jumps on the rat, smashing him to death and regaining the girl hippo. Before the two hefty lovers happily walk away, the boy elephant covers the rat's corpse in dirt and lays a flower pot beside.

Krazy shows up again to see what become of his would-be-friend. Saddened by this, he plays a solemn tune in his banjo, and his tears shower upon the flower pot. Seconds later, a flower grows from the pot and the rat's ghost appears on it. Annoyed by Krazy's gesture, the ghostly rat strikes the feline off his feet with a cinderblock before ascending to the great beyond.

See also
 Krazy Kat filmography

References

External links
 Love's Labor Lost at the Big Cartoon Database

1920 films
1920 animated films
1920 short films
1920s American animated films
1920s animated short films
American black-and-white films
American silent short films
Krazy Kat shorts
Films based on Love's Labour's Lost
Films directed by Vernon Stallings
American animated short films
Bray Productions films
Animated films about cats
Animated films about elephants
Animated films about rats
Films about even-toed ungulates